The Uzbekistan national badminton team represents Uzbekistan in international badminton team competitions. The Uzbekistani junior team have competed in the BWF World Junior Championships mixed team event, which is also called the Suhandinata Cup. The team also competed in the Badminton Asia Junior Championships.

History

Soviet era (1950s–1991) 

The start of Uzbek badminton began in the 1950s when the country was still a union republic of the Soviet Union. In 1963, the republic held its first national championships to crown the best players in the Uzbek region. Soon after, the Uzbek team competed in the USSR National Badminton Team Championships along with other republics including Azerbaijan, Kazakhstan and Tajikistan. The team managed to achieve 9th place out of the 14 republics in the championships. Since then, badminton in Uzbekistan grew in popularity, especially in the cities of Tashkent, Andijan and Navoiy.

Post-Soviet era (1991–present) 
After the dissolution of the Soviet Union, the Uzbekistan Badminton Federation became affiliated with Badminton Asia and started sending national players to compete in Asian tournaments.

Mixed team 
Before gaining independence, the Uzbek mixed team competed in the USSR National Badminton Team Championships and placed 9th of 14. In 1991, the Uzbek mixed team competed in the last edition of the Spartakiad and achieved 6th place.

The mixed team made their first international team competition debut at the 2023 Badminton Asia Mixed Team Championships. The team were grouped with China, South Korea and Singapore in Group A. The team finished at the bottom of the group after losing 0–5 the three teams and failed to qualify for the quarter-finals.

Competitive record

Asian Team Championships

Mixed team

Junior competitive record

Suhandinata Cup

Asian Junior Team Championships

Mixed team

Central Asia Regional Junior Team Championships

Mixed team

U17

U15

Staff 
The following list shows the coaching staff for the Uzbekistan national badminton team.

Players

Current squad

Men's team

Women's team

References 

Badminton
National badminton teams